Tuhobići (Cyrillic: Тухобићи) is a village in the municipality of Konjic, Bosnia and Herzegovina.

Tuhobići has an estimated terrain elevation above sea level is 1011 metres. Variant forms of spelling for Tuhobići or in other languages: Tuhobić, Tuhobići, Tuhobic, Tuhobici, Tuhobić, Tuhobići.

Demographics 
According to the 2013 census, its population was 59, all Bosniaks.

References

Populated places in Konjic